List of Italian Renaissance female artists  included painters, manuscript illustrators and sculptors who lived in Italy in 15-16th centuries.

List

15th century
 Catherine of Bologna (1413–1463) - nun, artist, saint
 Maria Ormani (1428–c.1470) - manuscript illustrator and nun
 Antonia Doni (Antonia di Paolo di Dono, Antonia Uccello) (1446-1491) - daughter of Paolo Uccello. Mentioned in documents as "pittoressa" - first usage of feminine term. Nun.
 Suor Barbara Ragnoni (15th century) - nun

16th century

 Eufrasia Burlamacchi (1482–1548) - manuscript illuminator, nun
 Properzia de' Rossi (1490-1530) - sculptor, the only woman to receive a biography in Vasari's Lives of the Artists.
 Teodora Danti (c.1498–c.1573) - painter, writer
 Plautilla Nelli (1524–1588) - nun
Anguissola family:
 Sofonisba Anguissola (c.1532–1625)
 Elena Anguissola (c.1532–1584), painter and nun
 Lucia Anguissola (c.1538 – c.1565)
 Irene di Spilimbergo (1540–1559) - painter and poet.
  Lucrezia Quistelli della Mirandola (1541-1594) 
 Diana Scultori (1547-1612) - engraver, daughter of the sculptor and engraver Giovanni Battista Ghisi. One of the first female engravers.
 Mariangiola Criscuolo (c.1548–1630) - daughter of painter Giovanni Filippo Criscuolo.
 Barbara Longhi (1552-1638) - daughter of painter Luca Longhi
  Lavinia Fontana (1552-1614) - daughter of painter Prospero Fontana. First female career artist in Western Europe as she relied on commissions for her income.
 Marietta Robusti (Tintoretta) (c.1560–1590) - daughter of Tintoretto
 Fede Galizia (1578–1630) - pioneering still life Renaissance painter
 Maria Angelica Razzi (16th century) - nun, sculptor

Late years (Baroque)
 Isabella Parasole (c.1570–c.1620), wood engraver
 Fede Galizia  (1578 – c. 1630) - still-life painter, daughter of painter Nunzio Galizia.
 Chiara Varotari (1584–1663)
 Lucrina Fetti (c.1590–1651) - daughter of painter Pietro Fetti, nun
 Angelica Veronica Airola (c.1590–1670) - nun
 Caterina Ginnasi (1590–1660)
 Artemisia Gentileschi (1593–c.1656)
 Orsola Maddalena Caccia (1596–1676) - nun, religious painter, daughter of Guglielmo Caccia.
 Maria Eufrasia della Croce (1597–1676) - nun, painter
 Arcangela Paladini (1599–1622)
 Giovanna Garzoni (1600-1670)

Bibliography
 Ambrogio Levati. Donne illustri. 1822
 Gadol, Joan Kelly, Did Women have a Renaissance?, in: Renate Bridenthal, Claudia Koonz, Becoming Visible. Women in European History, Boston 1970.
 King, Margaret L., Simpson, Catherine L., Women of the Renaissance, University of Chicago Press 1991.
 Garrard, Mary D., Angouissola and the Problem of the Woman Artist, Renaissance Quarterly 24, 1994.
 Zwanger, Meryl, Women and Art in the Renaissance, in: Sister, Columbia University 1995/6.
 Judith Brown. Gender and Society in Renaissance Italy (Women And Men In History). 1998
 Letizia Panizza, Women in Italian Renaissance Culture and Society. Oxford, 2000. ISBN 1-900755-09-2.
 Mary Rogers, Paola Tinagli. Women in Italy, 1350—1650.. Manchester University Press, 2005
 Gaia Servadio. Renaissance woman. 2005
 Nicholson, Elizabeth S. G. "Diana Scultori." Italian Women Artists from Renaissance to Baroque: National Museum of Women in the Arts. Milano: Skira, 2007
 Anne Sutherland Harris. Sofonisba, Lavinia, Artemisia, and Elisabetta: Thirty Years after Women Artists, 1550-1950. 2017
 Robin, Diana Maury, Larsen, Anne R. and Levin, Carole. Encyclopedia of women in the Renaissance: Italy, France, and England. — ABC-CLIO, Inc, 2007. — P. 160—161.
  Sheila Barker. Women Artists in Early Modern Italy: Careers, Fame, and Collectors. 2016

See also
 List of Italian women artists

References 

16th-century Italian women artists
Renaissance women
Italian women painters
-
Italian women artists, List of
Artists
Artists